Receptor-type tyrosine-protein phosphatase delta is an enzyme that, in humans, is encoded by the PTPRD gene.

Function 

The protein encoded by this gene is a member of the protein tyrosine phosphatase (PTP) family. PTPs are known to be signaling molecules that regulate a variety of cellular processes including cell growth, differentiation, mitotic cycle, and oncogenic transformation. This PTP contains an extracellular region, a single transmembrane segment and two tandem intracytoplasmic catalytic domains, thus represents a receptor-type PTP. The extracellular region of this protein is composed of three Ig-like and eight fibronectin type III-like domains. Studies of the similar genes in chick and fly suggest the role of this PTP is in promoting neurite growth, and regulating neurons axon guidance. Multiple tissue specific alternatively spliced transcript variants of this gene have been reported.

Ligand binding 
PTPRD is the orexigenic receptor of asprosin, a hormone that is produced by the C-terminal cleavage of profibrillin from the FBN1 gene. In mice, asprosin acts on an olfactory receptor, Olfr734 in the liver to regulate its gluconeogenic effects. However, PTPRD has been identified as the neural receptor for asprosin. Genetic ablation of PTPRD results in extreme leanness and loss of appetite. More specifically, resistance to diet-induced obesity can occur through the loss of PTPRD in AgRP neurons.  When asprosin binds to PTPRD, this leads to the de-phosphorylation and de-activation of Stat3.

Clinical significance 

PTPRD is highly expressed throughout the entire brain, especially in the cerebellum and cerebellar hemisphere. PTPRD is also highly expressed in the coronary arteries, the aorta, and the ovaries. Mutations in the PTPRD gene are also associated with autism, obsessive–compulsive disorder, and breast cancer.

Interactions 

PTPRD has been shown to interact with PTPRS and liprin-alpha-1.

References

Further reading